Michael or Mike Welch may refer to:
Michael Welch (actor) (born 1987), American actor
Michael Welch (footballer) (born 1982), Irish footballer
Micky Welch (born 1958), Barbadian/English football player
Mickey Welch (1859–1941), baseball player
Mike Welch (American football) (born 1951), American football coach, head football coach at Ithaca College, 1994–2016
Mike Welch (businessman), British CEO and founder of Blackcircles
Mike Welch (baseball) (born 1972), former right-handed pitcher in Major League Baseball

See also
Michael Welsh (disambiguation)